The Land That Time Forgot may refer to:

 The Land That Time Forgot (novel) (1918), by Edgar Rice Burroughs
 The Land That Time Forgot (1974 film)
 The Land That Time Forgot (2009 film)

See also 
 The Land Before Time (disambiguation)
 Land of the Lost (disambiguation)
 The War that Time Forgot